Chethan Jayalal is an Indian actor who appears in Malayalam films. He is known for Guppy (2016), Iyobinte Pusthakam (2014) and Oppam (2016). He won the Kerala State Film Award for Best Child Artist in 2016 for portraying the character Guppy in the film Guppy.

Filmography
Nanpakal Nerathu Mayakkam (2023)
Bheeshma Parvam (2022)
I promise RIA (2020)- Web Series
Ambili (2019)
 Varathan (2018) – Preman
Sanchari (2018) - Short film
En Kadhal (2018) - Musical Album
 Carbon (2018) – Kannan
 Crossroad (2017)
Sughamano Daveede. (2017)
 Rakshadhikari Baiju Oppu (2017) – Vipin
 Guppy (2016) – Guppy
 Oppam (2016) 
 Charlie (2015) – Balan Pillai
 Jilebi (2015)
 Lailaa O Lailaa (2015)
 Oru Vadakkan Selfie (2015)
 Chirakodinja Kinavukal (2015)
 Vikramadithyan (2014)
 Iyobinte Pusthakam (2014)
 Central Theater (2014)
 Sesham Kadhabhagam (2014)
 Law Point (2014)
 Thanal Theduna Bhoomi (2014)
 Salala Mobiles (2014)
 Orissa (2013)
 5 Sundarikal (2013) – Abhilash
 ABCD: American-Born Confused Desi (2013)
 Black Forest (2013)
 Theevram (2012)
 Ozhimuri (2012)
 Bachelor Party (2012)

Awards
Chethan Jayalal won Best Child Artist for Guppy at 47th Kerala State Film Awards, which was announced on 7 March 2017.

References

External links

Male actors in Malayalam cinema
Indian male film actors
Living people
Year of birth missing (living people)
21st-century Indian male actors